Gianluigi Rozza is an aerospace engineer and mathematician best known for his work on reduced-order modeling. He is currently full professor of Numerical Analysis at the International School for Advanced Studies (SISSA) in Trieste, where he serves as head of SISSA Mathematics Area and SISSA Director's Delegate for Research  Valorisation, Innovation, and Industrial Cooperation.

Personal life and education 
G. Rozza was born and raised in Italy where he earned a bachelor's and master's degree in Aerospace Engineering from the Polytechnic University of Milan in the year 2002. He subsequently moved to Lausanne, Switzerland to join the École Polytechnique Fédérale de Lausanne (EPFL) for postgraduate studies. At EPFL, he received a PhD in Numerical Analysis in 2005. His thesis, titled 'Shape Design by Optimal Flow Control and Reduced basis Techniques: Applications to Bypass Configurations in Haemodynamics', was completed under the supervision of Alfio Quarteroni and Anthony Tyr Patera.

Career 
Following his doctoral studies, G. Rozza worked at Ecole Polytechnique Fédérale de Lausanne in the professor Alfio Quarteroni's scientific group for a year. In 2006, he joined the Department of Mechanical Engineering and the Center for Computational Engineering at the MIT as a Postdoctoral Associate Researcher in the professor Anthony Tyr Patera's group. He stayed at the MIT until 2008. After a period as a Senior Researcher and Lecturer at the EPFL, in 2012, Rozza joined the Applied Mathematics group, SISSA mathLab, at the International School for Advanced Studies (SISSA) where, in 2014, he became professor.

In 2018 he received an ERC Consolidator Grant (CoG) from the European Research Council (ERC) with the proposal «AROMA-CFD» (2016-2022), and in 2022 he won a ERC Proof of Concept Grant PoC (Proof of Concept). for the project «ARGOS». 

On December 2021 he was ranked n.1152 in the Top Scientist-Mathematics from research.com, n.35 in Italy. G. Rozza is currently n.20 in the Top Italian Scientists Mathematics ranking. On September 2022 he was listed in the World’s Top 2% Scientist ranking, made by Stanford University in collaboration with Elsevier and Scopus. As of January 2023 Rozza co-authored 3 books and edited other 10 (12 volumes) on numerical analysis and model order reduction.

In addition to research, G. Rozza is the President of SMACT Innovation Ecosystem's supervisory board, and he is  an executive committee member of ECCOMAS (European Community on Computational Methods in Applied Sciences)..

Recognitions
In 2004 Rozza received the Bill Morton CFD Prize at the Oxford ICFD conference.
Rozza Received the Riconoscenza Civica from his birthplace (Sant'Angelo Lodigiano).
In 2006 he received the Phd Award from ECCOMAS Congress (European Community on Computational Methods in Applied Sciences) in Amsterdam.
In 2009 Rozza received the Springer Computational Science and Engineering (CSE) Award  in Monaco with Phuong Huynh and Cuong Nguyen for the rbMIT software, developed at MIT in Boston.
Rozza received the Dardo D'oro from his City of residence (Castiraga Vidardo) in 2010.
In 2014 he received the Jacques-Louis Lions Award at ECCOMAS Congress (European Community on Computational Methods in Applied Sciences) in Barcelona.
In 2022 Rozza gave the first Solari Lecture at the Polytechnic University of Milan, Italy.

References

External links 
  
  
  

1977 births
Living people
Italian mathematicians
Italian engineers
Polytechnic University of Milan alumni